Omar Kent Dykes (born Kent Dykes, 1950, McComb, Mississippi, United States) is an American blues guitarist and singer, living in Austin, Texas.

He began leading bands as an adolescent in McComb, Mississippi.

In 1973 he formed the band, Omar & the Howlers.  The band plays electric Texas blues, rock and roll and blues-rock. Dykes has also had a successful career as a solo artist, and regularly toured European countries.

Among his solo albums are Blues Bag from 1991, and Muddy Springs Road from 1994.

An Austin Music Hall of Fame inductee, he was afflicted in 2017 with a skin illness that wasted away the flesh of his arms, and he lost the ability to perform in public. In 2020 he published a memoir, OMAR DYKES: The Life and Times of a Poor and Almost Famous Bluesman.

Discography
 Big Leg Beat (1980, Stomp)
 I Told You So (1984, Clyde Frog)
 Hard Times in the Land of Plenty (1987, Columbia)
 Wall of Pride (1988, Columbia)
 Monkey Land (1990, Antone's)
 Blues Bag (1991, Provogue) (solo album)
 Live at Paradiso (1992, Provogue)
 Courts of Lulu (1993, Provogue)
 Muddy Springs Road (1995, Provogue)
 World Wide Open (1996, Provogue)
 Southern Style (1997, Provogue)
 Swing Land (1999, Provogue)
 Live at the Opera House: Austin, Texas - August 30, 1987 (2000, Provogue)
 The Screamin' Cat (2000, Provogue)
 Big Delta (2002, Provogue)
 Boogie Man (2004, Ruf)
 Bamboozled: Live in Germany (2006, Ruf)
 On The Jimmy Reed Highway (2007, Ruf) (with Jimmie Vaughan, Lou Ann Barton and others.)
 Big Town Playboy (2009, Ruf)
 Essential Collection (2012, Ruf) 2CD
 I'm Gone (2012, Big Guitar)
 Too Much is Not Enough (2012, Big Guitar)
 Running With the Wolf (2013, Provogue) (solo album)

References

1950 births
Living people
American blues guitarists
American male guitarists
American blues singers
American male singers
Blues rock musicians
Texas blues musicians
Guitarists from Texas
20th-century American guitarists
20th-century American male musicians
Provogue Records artists